Hautere railway station was a flag station on the North Island Main Trunk in New Zealand.

The Wellington-Manawatu Line was opened by the Wellington and Manawatu Railway Company (WMR) when the first through train from Wellington to Palmerston North ran on 30 November 1886. Hautere was part of the Waikanae to Ōtaki contract, let to Messrs Wilkie and Wilson. The station wasn't in the February 1887 timetable, but had opened by December 1887, when WMR was selling nearby land and was in an 1888 timetable. By 1895 it was only a siding for goods traffic, with a sawmill. On 3 February 1900 it was reported as closed.

Only a single track now passes through the station site.

References

Rail transport in Wellington
Defunct railway stations in New Zealand
Railway stations opened in 1889
Railway stations closed in 1900
Buildings and structures in the Kapiti Coast District